Thijs Houwing (born 22 April 1981) is a Dutch former professional footballer who played as a striker.

Playing career

Club career
Born in Vasse, Houwing began his career with Twente, scoring on his professional debut on 26 March 2000. He also played professionally for De Graafschap and Cambuur.

Houwing later played for Kozakken Boys, SV Spakenburg, HHC Hardenberg and DOS'37.

International career
Houwing represented the Netherlands at the 2001 FIFA World Youth Championship, making 4 appearances in the tournament.

Later career
While playing part-time for SV Spakenburg, Houwing also worked in the marketing department at Heracles Almelo. He had previously studied Commercial Sport Economics at the Johan Cruyff University.

References

1981 births
Living people
Dutch footballers
FC Twente players
De Graafschap players
SC Cambuur players
Kozakken Boys players
SV Spakenburg players
HHC Hardenberg players
Eredivisie players
Eerste Divisie players
Derde Divisie players
Association football forwards
Netherlands youth international footballers
People from Tubbergen
Footballers from Overijssel